The 1985 LFF Lyga was the 64th season of the LFF Lyga football competition in Lithuania.  It was contested by 17 teams, and Ekranas Panevezys won the championship.

League standings

References
RSSSF

LFF Lyga seasons
football
Lith